KCEA (89.1 FM) is a broadcast radio station licensed to Atherton, California, serving the San Francisco Peninsula. The station broadcasts a music format featuring big band, swing and adult standards in addition to local high school sports.  KCEA is owned and operated by Sequoia Union High School District.

History
In 1979, Menlo-Atherton High School founded radio station KMAH, which broadcast local music and student programming. During off hours, the station broadcast a live audio feed of the Pacific Ocean from Fort Point, San Francisco. KMAH became KCEA (named after "sea") in 1983 and switched to its present big band music format in order to attract a wider audience and financial support.

KCEA first broadcast local high school sports on January 8, 1999, when the station broadcast a Menlo-Atherton home basketball game. The October 11, 2013 broadcast of a football game between Sequoia and Terra Nova high schools was KCEA's 500th high school sports broadcast.

Late in October 2018, the Sequoia Union High School District Board of Trustees discussed converting KCEA into a student run station in order to align the station closer to the district's educational mission.

The NAMM Oral History Program music historian, Daniel Del Fiorentino, conducted his first interview when he worked for the KCEA radio station in 1983 to 1994. He has since then interviewed thousands of people of who have made an impact on the history of music.

References

External links
FCC History Cards for KCEA
 
 

CEA
High school radio stations in the United States
Radio stations established in 1979
1979 establishments in California
Adult standards radio stations in the United States